Wien Hütteldorf (German for Vienna Hütteldorf) (Hütteldorf-Hacking until 1981) is a railway station located in the Penzing district of Vienna, Austria.  Opened in 1858, it is owned and operated by the Austrian Federal Railways (ÖBB), and is served by long distance, regional and S-Bahn trains.

References

External links 

Hütteldorf
Buildings and structures in Penzing (Vienna)
Railway stations opened in 1858
1858 establishments in the Austrian Empire
Art Nouveau architecture in Vienna
Art Nouveau railway stations
Railway stations in Austria opened in the 19th century